The Duel at Silver Creek is a 1952 American Western film directed by Don Siegel; his first film in the Western genre. It starred Stephen McNally, Audie Murphy and Faith Domergue. It was the first time Murphy had appeared in a film where he played a character who was good throughout the movie. The working titles of the film were Claim Jumpers and Hair Trigger Kid.

Plot
Luke Cromwell, aka the "Silver Kid" (Audie Murphy), loses his father to mining claim jumpers. He is deputised by Marshal Lightning Tyrone (Stephen McNally) of Silver City, who wants to defeat the claim jumpers. The two men fall for different women, Tyrone for the treacherous Opal Lacey (Faith Domergue), who is secretly in league with the claim jumpers, and Cromwell with tomboy Dusty Fargo (Susan Cabot) who pursues Lightning.

Cast
 Audie Murphy as Luke Cromwell – The Silver Kid
 Faith Domergue as Opal Lacey
 Stephen McNally as Marshal Lightning Tyrone (as Stephen Mc.Nally) 
 Susan Cabot as Jane "Dusty" Fargo
 Gerald Mohr as Rod Lacey
 Eugene Iglesias as Johnny Sombrero
 James Anderson as Rat Face Blake (as Kyle James)
 Walter Sande as Pete Fargo
 Lee Marvin as "Tinhorn" Burgess
 George Eldredge as Jim Ryan – Bartender
 Griff Barnett as Dan 'Pop' Muzik

Reception
Quentin Tarantino called it "a very well conceived and executed picture, as well as being obviously a Siegel picture."

References

External links
 
 
 
 

1952 films
1952 Western (genre) films
American Western (genre) films
Audie Murphy
Films directed by Don Siegel
Universal Pictures films
Revisionist Western (genre) films
1950s English-language films
1950s American films